American INSIGHT is a 501(c)(3) nonprofit organization registered in the State of Pennsylvania.

History 
American INSIGHT was founded in 1983 by Margaret Chew Barringer under the original name of the American Poetry Center to promote free speech and the spoken word. Its success in Pennsylvania led to the creation of National Poetry Month. The organization legally changed its name to American INSIGHT.

American Insight, in its original incarnation as the American Poetry Center, is referred to in various literary and artistic settings and critical works (for example in discussing Robert Creeley)

Free Speech Film Festival  
American INSIGHT facilitates the annual Free Speech Film Festival via the world wide reach of FilmFreeway, and is open to established as well as emerging independent film filmmakers across the world with films focusing on free speech and human rights.

Recent Free Speech Film Festival Award winners include:
2019: Suppressed: The Fight to Vote, a documentary by Robert Greenwald
2020: Boxed, a documentary by Wanjiru Njendu

Notes

Further reading
A Sacred Challenge:Violet Oakley and the Pennsylvania Capitol Murals. United States of America: The Pennsylvania Capitol Preservation Committee, 2002. 
Ryan, S. E. (2000). Robert Indiana: Figures of speech. New Haven, CT: Yale University Press. 
Konkle, B. A. (1932). Benjamin Chew 1722–1810: Head of the Pennsylvania judiciary system under colony and commonwealth. Philadelphia, PA: University of Pennsylvania Press.

Non-profit organizations based in Pennsylvania
Companies based in Philadelphia
History of Philadelphia
Organizations based in Philadelphia
Culture of Philadelphia
Mass media in Philadelphia
1983 establishments in Pennsylvania